is a Japanese manga series by Hiro Fujiwara. It was serialized in Hakusensha's monthly shōjo magazine LaLa from December 2005 to September 2013, with its chapters collected in 18 tankōbon volumes.

A 26-episode anime adaptation produced by J.C.Staff aired between April and September 2010.

Plot

Once an all-boys high school, Seika High, infamous for its rowdy students, has recently become a co-ed school. However, with the female population remaining a minority even after the change over the recent years, Misaki Ayuzawa works hard to make the school a better place for girls. She puts a lot of effort into academics and athletics and earns the trust of the teachers. Eventually, she becomes the first female student council president. Misaki has gained a reputation among the male student body as a strict boy-hating demon dictator and as a shining hope for the teachers and fellow female students. However, despite her reputation, she secretly works part-time at a maid café to support her mother and younger sister by returning the huge debt their father had left them.

Unfortunately, Misaki's secret is soon discovered by Takumi Usui, a popular boy at Seika High. Instead of exposing it to the school, though, Usui keeps it for himself and even becomes a regular customer at the café, much to Misaki's chagrin. Known for being a genius in pretty much everything from academics to athletics and for having rejected numerous confessions of his female peers, Usui takes a liking to Misaki because he finds her 'interesting'. After going through various awkward situations, including being confronted by a forgotten childhood friend of hers, Misaki falls in love with Usui, who reciprocates, and the two soon become a couple.

However, their relationship is troubled by Usui's difficult familial past coming back to haunt him. Being an illegitimate child of a wealthy English noble family, Usui technically cannot form a relationship with anyone not in his social standing, Misaki included. Misaki has to see Usui being forced to transfer to a prestigious rival school Miabigaoka, and then away from Japan completely when his family takes him back to England. 

However, they graduate and Usui and Misaki eventually marry ten years later.

Media

Manga
Maid Sama! is written and illustrated by Hiro Fujiwara. This series was serialized in Hakusensha's shōjo manga magazine LaLa, from December 24, 2005 to September 24, 2013. The 85 individual chapters were collected into eighteen tankōbon volumes, released between September 5, 2006 and February 5, 2014.

At their Anime Expo 2008 panel, North American publisher Tokyopop announced its various newly licensed series and that Kaichō wa Maid-sama! would be titled Maid-sama!. The series has been relicensed by Viz Media in North America, JPF in Poland, Pika Édition in France, Carlsen Verlag in Germany, Panini Comics in Italy, Mexico and Brazil, and Everglory Publishing Co in Taiwan. In Indonesia, the series was published by M&C Comic.

Volume list

Anime

The October 2009 issue of LaLa announced that a 26 episode anime television adaptation of the series would be produced. It was broadcast in TBS and BS-TBS during Spring 2010. The April 2010 issue of LaLa revealed the broadcast date to be on April 1, 2010 at 1:55 midnight. The adaptation was also present at the Tokyo International Anime Fair with Ayumi Fujimura, Nobuhiko Okamoto, Kana Hanazawa and Yū Kobayashi's attendance. The anime series is licensed by Sentai Filmworks, with The Anime Network currently streaming the series on their video portal. Anime distributor Section23 Films released the first subtitled-only set on DVD, June 7, 2011. The second subtitled-DVD set was released on August 2, 2011. A complete collection on DVD was released on October 9, 2012. Sentai Filmworks & Section23 re-released the series on DVD and Blu-ray, with an English dub on January 27, 2015.

The staff list was announced and Hiroaki Sakurai directed the series with series composition done by Mamiko Ikeda who previously worked on the series composition for Emma: A Victorian Romance series and most recently the Rental Magica series and Hanasakeru Seishōnen, while the animation character designs by Yuki Imoto and music composed by Tōru Motoyama. The series was animated by J.C.Staff who previously worked on Honey and Clover, Toradora! and Nodame Cantabile. Ayumi Fujimura and Nobuhiko Okamoto took on the role of Misaki Ayuzawa and Takumi Usui respectively.

Drama CDs
A drama CD for Kaichō wa Maid-sama was released in Japan.

Reception
Connie C. described the manga as being "pretty entertaining, if shallow", feeling that it was sexist towards both genders, but lighthearted enough in this that offense could not be taken, saying that she would continue to read the series as a "guilty pleasure". Deb Aoki feels that the maid café setting provides both fanservice and a vehicle to critique gender roles. In contrast, Johanna Draper Carlson feels that the story is "a male fantasy, where the scary, strong, smart, self-possessed girl turns out to secretly be subservient to men. It’s sort of funny to read, until you think about what its real messages are." Robert Harris notes the formulaic beginnings, but feels that the characters make the manga enjoyable. Leroy Douresseaux found the character of Takumi unconvincing, describing him as a "cheap plot trick" to rescue Misaki when needed. Carlo Santos felt the premise was "otaku-tastic", but appreciated the lack of fanservice and panty shots in the maid cafe scenes, feeling that these marked the series as being shōjo. He also appreciated the chemistry between the leads, and the humour, but noted the stereotypical plot, and criticises the layouts and overly-talky characters. Connie C. described the second volume as reminding her that plot devices are plot devices because "they work wonderfully if used right", feeling that the sense of humour and character interactions lifted the stereotypical plots of the school sports day and rich new classmates.

In a 2019 Forbes article about the best anime of the 2010s decade, Lauren Orsini considered it to be one of the five best anime of 2010; she wrote, "Clever comedy with snappy delivery keeps this show sharp even ten years later".

References

External links
 Maid Sama! at Hakusensha 
 Maid Sama! at TBS 
 
Maid Sama filler list - All Episode Guide September 2022 Anime Filler List

2005 manga
2010 anime television series debuts
Hakusensha franchises
Hakusensha manga
J.C.Staff
Japanese high school television series
NBCUniversal Entertainment Japan
Romantic comedy anime and manga
School life in anime and manga
Sentai Filmworks
Shōjo manga
TBS Television (Japan) original programming
Tokyopop titles
Viz Media manga